

A*6601 Frequencies

References

6